The 1977 World Table Tennis Championships mixed doubles was the 34th edition of the mixed doubles championship.  

Jacques Secrétin and Claude Bergeret defeated Tokio Tasaka and Sachiko Yokota in the final by three sets to nil.

Results

See also
List of World Table Tennis Championships medalists

References

-